Cambridge Township is one of twenty-four townships in Henry County, Illinois, USA.  As of the 2010 census, its population was 2,525 and it contained 1,070 housing units.

Geography

Cities, towns, villages
 Cambridge

Unincorporated towns
 Ulah at 
(This list is based on USGS data and may include former settlements.)

Adjacent townships
 Munson Township (north)
 Cornwall Township (northeast)
 Burns Township (east)
 Galva Township (southeast)
 Weller Township (south)
 Andover Township (west)
 Osco Township (northwest)

Cemeteries
The township contains these two cemeteries: McNay and Talbot.

Major highways
  Illinois Route 81
  Illinois Route 82

Demographics

School districts
 Cambridge Community Unit School District 227
 Galva Community Unit School District 224

Political districts
 Illinois's 14th congressional district
 State House District 74
 State Senate District 37

References
 
 United States Census Bureau 2008 TIGER/Line Shapefiles
 United States National Atlas

External links
 City-Data.com
 Illinois State Archives
 Township Officials of Illinois

Townships in Henry County, Illinois
Townships in Illinois